Wild rhubarb may refer to several different plants:
 Arctium minus, native to Europe, in family Asteraceae
 Ipomoea pandurata, herbaceous perennial vine named to North America, in family Convolvulaceae
 Heracleum mantegazzianum, a toxic plant native to central Asia, in family Apiaceae
 Rumex hymenosepalus, native to North America, in family Polygonaceae
 Polygonum alaskanum, native to Alaska, in family Polygonaceae